Michal Frydrych (born 27 February 1990) is a Czech professional footballer who plays as a centre-back for Czech First League side Baník Ostrava.

Career
On 5 March 2017, he scored the winning goal in Slavia's 1–0 victory over Viktoria Plzeň, a match between the two forerunners for the title that season, and eventually won the title with Slavia. He also scored the winning goal in the match that clinched the title for Slavia Prague.

Career statistics

Club

References

External links
 
 
 Michal Frydrych official international statistics
 Michal Frydrych profile on the SK Sklavia Prague official website

1990 births
Living people
Czech footballers
Czech Republic under-21 international footballers
Czech expatriate footballers
Czech First League players
Ekstraklasa players
FC Baník Ostrava players
SK Slavia Prague players
Wisła Kraków players
Association football defenders
Expatriate footballers in Poland
Czech expatriate sportspeople in Poland